Baba Mukteshwarnath Dham is a godly sacred place of Hinduism dedicated to Lord Shiva In village Deoghar, in the Indian state of Bihar. Baba Mukteshwarnath Dham is considered as one of the best temples in Deoghar, Bihar.

Location 
Baba Mukteshwarnath Dham  is situated in Deohar village of Andhrathari block under Madhubani district in the  Indian state of Bihar.

History 
According to religious beliefs, Baba Mukteshwarnath Dham has a history of about 200 years. Although there are many very important places in Mithilanchal (Bihar), which are completely neglected by historians and archaeologists, but the prevailing story traditions  and folk beliefs about those places reveal their past. Shri Shri Baba Mukteshwar Nath Mahadev Temple is famous as Mukteshwar place, is a very historical and archaeological religious place.

It is believed that while on one hand the famous register-practice of Mithilanchal is associated with Baba Mukteshwarnath Dham, on the other hand many artifacts of archaeological importance are also attracting researchers towards them.

It is believed that the Mukteshwar Nath temple was built around 200 years ago. From the archaeological point of view, Mukteshwar place is a very important place. The Shivling here is unique. A few decades ago, the work of excavation was done by a sannyasi, then he saw that this Shivling became very thick and huge on going down, due to which the excavation work was stopped and filled again and made worshipable. During the excavation of the soil, a very beautiful idol of Ganesh and Parvati was also found, which is still installed in the Parvati temple.

Tourism 
From all across the district as well as state, devotees come here to pray for their better life ahead. This temple is the best place for holy expeditions and tourists.

See also 

 List of Hindu Temples in India

References 

Hindu temples in Bihar